Brizo  (Greek: Βριζώ; derived from Ancient Greek word βρίζω meaning "to slumber") is an ancient Greek goddess who was known as the protector of mariners, sailors, and fishermen.  She was worshipped primarily by the women of Delos, who set out food offerings in small boats. Brizo was also known as a prophet specializing in the interpretation of dreams.

References

Greek sea goddesses
Mythological Greek seers
Oracular goddesses